FFFFOUND! was a social bookmarking web site that allowed registered users to share already existing images on the Internet and to receive personalized recommendations of other images. Users not registered could view these posts and the corresponding recommendations; registration was strictly by invitation. The site was established in 2007 by Yosuke Abe and Keita Kitamura of the Japanese company Tha, owned by Yugo Nakamura.

The site closed down on 15 May 2017.

Operation
FFFFOUND! operated as a social bookmarking web site for sharing already existing images on the Internet. Based on their support of other images by means of a like button, users received personalized recommendations comprising other images. These recommendations were available to the public and may serve as artistic inspiration.

FFFFOUND! was established by Yosuke Abe and Keita Kitamura of Tha, a Japanese web development company owned by Yugo Nakamura, in June 2007. Since its founding, registration has been allowed strictly by invitation, out of fear of the site becoming too large to organize and manage. Nakamura avoided elements of modern web design while directing the development of the site in order to keep its appearance simple. By December 2008, the site hosted over 500,000 images.

Reception
An editor of Creativity called FFFFOUND! a magnet for graphic designers at the launch of the site's beta version in 2008. Calling invitations to this release a desirable commodity, the editor praised the site's ease of use and the unpredictable nature of its algorithm for creating recommendations. Russell Davies of Campaign called social interaction on the site minimal but thought the community of users cohesive in spite of this. Louisa Pacifico of Design Week considered the small number of users constructive to the site's quality and thought that the large number of images would leave any user regularly satisfied.

The Brazilian web designer Fabio Giolito created We Heart It, another image bookmarking service, in response to FFFFOUND!'s limited registration.

Notes

References

External links

Internet properties established in 2007
Internet properties disestablished in 2017
Japanese social networking websites
Image-sharing websites
Social bookmarking websites